Drepanosticta is a genus of damselfly in the family Platystictidae. Some authors consider some species to be in the genus Ceylonosticta.

Species
The genus includes the following species:

 
Drepanosticta actaeon
Drepanosticta adami
Drepanosticta amboinensis
Drepanosticta anascephala
Drepanosticta annandalei
Drepanosticta annulata
Drepanosticta arcuata
Drepanosticta aries
Drepanosticta attala
Drepanosticta auricuata
Drepanosticta austeni
Drepanosticta barbatula
Drepanosticta bartelsi
Drepanosticta belyshevi
Drepanosticta berinchangensis
Drepanosticta berlandi
Drepanosticta bicolor
Drepanosticta bicornuta
Drepanosticta bifida
Drepanosticta bispana
Drepanosticta brincki
Drepanosticta brownelli
Drepanosticta carmichaeli
Drepanosticta ceratophora
Drepanosticta claaseni
Drepanosticta clavata
Drepanosticta conica
Drepanosticta crenitis
Drepanosticta dendrolagina
Drepanosticta dentifera
Drepanosticta digna
Drepanosticta doisuthepensis
Drepanosticta dorcadion
Drepanosticta drusilla
Drepanosticta dulitensis
Drepanosticta dupophila
Drepanosticta elongata
 Drepanosticta emtrai
Drepanosticta ephippiata
Drepanosticta eucera
Drepanosticta exoleta
Drepanosticta floresiana
Drepanosticta fontinalis
Drepanosticta forficula
Drepanosticta fraseri
Drepanosticta gazella
Drepanosticta halmachera
Drepanosticta halterata
Drepanosticta hamadryas
Drepanosticta hamulifera
Drepanosticta hilaris
Drepanosticta hongkongensis
Drepanosticta inconspicua
Drepanosticta inversa
Drepanosticta jurzitzai
Drepanosticta khaochongensis
Drepanosticta kruegeri
Drepanosticta lankanensis
Drepanosticta lepyricollis
Drepanosticta lestoides
Drepanosticta lymetta
Drepanosticta machadoi Theischinger & Richards, 2014
Drepanosticta magna
Drepanosticta marsyas
Drepanosticta megametta'Drepanosticta misoolensisDrepanosticta moluccanaDrepanosticta monocerosDrepanosticta montanaDrepanosticta mooreiDrepanosticta mylittaDrepanosticta nietneriDrepanosticta obiensisDrepanosticta palauensisDrepanosticta panDrepanosticta penicillataDrepanosticta philippaDrepanosticta polychromaticaDrepanosticta psygmaDrepanosticta quadrataDrepanosticta robustaDrepanosticta rudiculaDrepanosticta rufostigmaDrepanosticta sembilanensisDrepanosticta septimaDrepanosticta sharpiDrepanosticta siebersiDrepanosticta silenusDrepanosticta sinhalensisDrepanosticta siuDrepanosticta spatuliferaDrepanosticta starmuehlneriDrepanosticta submontanaDrepanosticta subtropicaDrepanosticta sundanaDrepanosticta taurusDrepanosticta tenellaDrepanosticta trimaculataDrepanosticta tropicaDrepanosticta versicolorDrepanosticta vietnamicaDrepanosticta viridisDrepanosticta walliDrepanosticta watuwilensisDrepanosticta wildermuthi Villanueva & Schorr, 2011Drepanosticta zhoui''

References

Platystictidae
Zygoptera genera
Taxonomy articles created by Polbot